"295" is a song recorded by Punjabi singer Sidhu Moose Wala, released on 14 July, 2021, ten months before the singer's death. The song was written by Sidhu Moose Wala and produced by The Kidd and was featured on his third studio album Moosetape (2021).

Commercial performance 

"295" peaked at 62nd position in the Canadian Hot 100 and 37th in the New Zealand Hot 40 Singles chart.

In June 2022, following Moose Wala's death, "295" reached 154th in the Billboard Global 200 and 73rd in the Billboard Global Excl. US. It was the first time a Punjabi singer had entered the Billboard Global 200.

Charts

References

Punjabi albums
Indian songs